The following is a list of Japanese films distributed in 2002.

Highest-grossing films

List of films
A list of films released in Japan in 2002 (see 2002 in film).

See also 
 2002 in Japan
 2002 in Japanese television

References

Footnotes

Sources

External links
 Japanese films of 2002 at the Internet Movie Database

2002
Japanese
Films